"Strange Town" is a 1979 single by The Jam. The single was released on 9 March 1979 and reached No. 15 in the UK Singles Chart on 8 April.
In 1983 it was certified Silver for 250,000 sales 

This single, backed by the Paul Weller-penned "The Butterfly Collector", only appeared on one of the band's studio albums, the Canadian Polydor pressing of Setting Sons. "Strange Town" also appears on the greatest hits album Snap! "The Butterfly Collector" also appears in the 1996 The Jam Collection compilation album as well as on Snap!

The start of the promotional video for the single was filmed at the entrance to the underground section of London Victoria station.

US release
The single was also released in the US in May 1979, as Polydor #14553. However, for the American release "The Butterfly Collector" was catalogued as the A-side. The single did not chart in the States. Pressings were issued on both see-through gold vinyl and standard black vinyl. The latter appears to be the less common variety, but neither edition is rare. Other than colour, there is no difference between the two issues. There was no picture sleeve for the US issue. Gold vinyl issues were packaged in a clear plastic sleeve. Black vinyl issues were marketed in standard Polydor house sleeves.

"The Butterfly Collector"
The B-side, which Paul Weller wrote about NME music journalist Julie Burchill, was covered by Noel Gallagher with Weller at a Teenage Cancer Trust gig at the Royal Albert Hall in 2007. This track was also included on a CD of songs given away with the 15 March 2009 edition of The Sunday Times. It has also been covered by Garbage as a b-side of the "Queer" single: that version was later included on the tribute album, Fire & Skill: The Songs of the Jam.

Reception
The song was ranked at number five among the top "Tracks of the Year" for 1979 by NME. In a 2015 interview granted to Radio X, Paul Weller opined "Strange Town" as one of the three best songs he has written in his entire career.

Track listing
A. "Strange Town" – 3:48
B. "The Butterfly Collector" – 3:11

References

1979 singles
The Jam songs
Songs written by Paul Weller
Polydor Records singles
1979 songs
Song recordings produced by Vic Coppersmith-Heaven